Dictyotales is a large order in the brown algae (class Phaeophyceae).  Members of this order generally prefer warmer waters than other brown algae.  One genus in this order is calcareous, Padina, the only calcareous member of this phylum.

Dictyota dominates 70% of the benthos biomass in the Florida Keys reef tract. The successful spread of this alga is due in part to its ability to asexually reproduce from fragments created by "biotic and abiotic disturbances".

References

Further reading

 
 

 
Brown algae orders
Monotypic eukaryote orders